Norton Paulet or Powlett may refer to:

 Norton Powlett (died 1741), Member of Parliament for Petersfield
 Norton Powlett (died 1750), his son, MP for Winchester